Alfred Elisha Ames (December 14, 1814 – September 23, 1874) was an American physician and politician.

Born in Colchester, Vermont, he moved to Orwell, Ohio, in 1831. In 1836 he moved to Chicago, Illinois. He then moved to Vandalia, Illinois, where he served as deputy secretary of state of Illinois and as private secretary to the Governor of Illinois. In 1839, he moved to Springfield, Illinois where he served in the same positions and clerk of the Illinois House of Representatives. He lived in Belvedere and Roscoe, Illinois. In 1845, Ames graduated from Rush Medical College. He served in the Illinois House of Representatives and then in the Illinois State Senate. He also served as probate judge and postmaster of Roscoe, Illinois. In 1851, he moved to Minnesota Territory and settled in what is now Minneapolis, Minnesota. In 1853, Ames served in the Minnesota Territorial House of Representatives. In 1857 he served in the first Minnesota Constitutional Convention of 1857 as a Democrat. He practiced medicine in Minneapolis until his death in 1874. His son was A.A. Ames who was also a physician and mayor of Minneapolis.
Ames also served as the first Masonic Grand Master for the Grand Lodge of Minnesota from 1853-1855

See also
 Eli B. Ames, brother of Alfred Elisha Ames

Notes

1814 births
1874 deaths
People from Belvidere, Illinois
People from Roscoe, Illinois
Politicians from Minneapolis
People from Colchester, Vermont
Rush Medical College alumni
Physicians from Illinois
Physicians from Minnesota
Members of the Minnesota Territorial Legislature
19th-century American politicians
Members of the Illinois House of Representatives
Illinois state senators
Illinois state court judges
People from Vandalia, Illinois
People from Springfield, Illinois
People from Orwell, Ohio
19th-century American judges